The Torch River Rail Inc is a Canadian short line railway company operating on trackage in Saskatchewan, Canada on the former Canadian Pacific Railway White Fox subdivision, built in 1929, that runs from Nipawin, through White Fox, Love (no railroad siding anymore), Garrick (no siding anymore) to Choiceland.

The Torch River Rail network consists of 45 km of its own trackage. The railway also passes over the Crooked Bridge. From the crooked bridge, it interchanges cars with CP Rail at Nipawin.

References

Saskatchewan railways
Standard gauge railways in Canada